This is a list of defunct airlines of South Korea.

See also
 List of airlines of South Korea

References

South korea
Airlines
Airlines, defunct